Jaime Vendera is known for filming MythBusters, where he shattered a wine glass using his voice.

Vendera is an author and vocal coach.

Performances 
During the filming of MythBusters, Vendera's voice was measured at 117 dB at 48 meters, as recorded by Dr. Roger Schwenke of Meyer Sound Laboratories. That is equivalent to 120 dB at one meter.

Vendera has performed on several television programs.

Work 
Vendera publishes music-related books and teaches voice through the Vendera Vocal Academy.

Books 
See Jaime Vendera’s website.

References

External links
 Official Website
Meyer Sound Helps Mythbusters Attain Smashing Success

American rock singers
Living people
American vocal coaches
Musicians Institute alumni
Year of birth missing (living people)